This is a list of Scottish National Party (SNP) Members of Parliament (MPs) elected to the House of Commons for the Fifty-Fourth Parliament of the United Kingdom (2005 to 2010).

It includes both MPs elected at the 2005 general election, held on 5 May 2005, and those subsequently elected in by-elections.

The list is sorted by the name of the MP.

MPs

See also
 Scottish National Party
 Results of the 2005 United Kingdom general election
 Members of the House of Lords
 List of MPs for Scotland
 List of MPs for Scottish constituencies 2005–2010

 2005
Scottish National Party